Adrienne C. Thomas is the former acting Archivist of the United States.  She assumed the position of Acting Archivist when the ninth Archivist, Allen Weinstein, announced his resignation on December 7, 2008, effective December 19.  Weinstein explained that he was resigning for health reasons. She was succeeded by David Ferriero, who was confirmed by the U.S. Senate on November 6, 2009, as the tenth Archivist of the United States. After 40 years with the National Archives, Ms. Thomas retired on April 1, 2011.

Thomas is a graduate of Iowa State University with a master's degree in American history.

Career
 2007–2011 – Deputy Archivist of the United States.
 2008–2009 – Acting Archivist of the United States.
 1994–2007 – Assistant Archivist for Administration and Chief Financial Officer.
 1987–1994 – Deputy to the Assistant Archivist for Administrative Services.
 1974–1987 – Director of the Planning and Analysis Division.

References

External links
 

Living people
American archivists
Female archivists
Iowa State University alumni
Year of birth missing (living people)
National Archives and Records Administration
George W. Bush administration personnel
Obama administration personnel